Eric Futch (born April 25, 1993) is a track and field athlete who represents the United States and competes in the 400-meter hurdles.

Competing for the Florida Gators, Futch won the 400 meter hurdles at the 2016 NCAA Division I Outdoor Track and Field Championships.

At the 2012 World Junior Championships in Athletics, Futch won the 400 metres hurdles.

Futch won the 400 meter hurdles at the 2017 USA Outdoor Track and Field Championships to qualify for the 2017 World Championships in Athletics.

References

External links 
 
 
 

1993 births
Living people
American male hurdlers
African-American male track and field athletes
Florida Gators men's track and field athletes
World Athletics Championships athletes for the United States
USA Outdoor Track and Field Championships winners
21st-century African-American sportspeople